"Shake Ya Ass", also known by its clean title, "Shake It Fast", is the first single released from American rapper Mystikal's album, Let's Get Ready. It also features uncredited vocals from Pharrell. It was released July 18, 2000 and produced by The Neptunes. It was a huge success for Mystikal, peaking at number 13 on the Billboard Hot 100, number 3 on the Hot R&B/Hip-Hop Songs and number 7 on the Hot Rap Singles. Both the song and music video (directed by Little X) received heavy radio airplay and it has possibly become Mystikal's most well-known song. "Shake Ya Ass" was followed by another top 20 hit, "Danger (Been So Long)".

History
There were two edited versions of the song, allowing radio stations to choose between the two refrains but both versions had modified lyrics. Only the edited version of "Shake Ya Ass" was never released as opposed to "Shake It Fast" on the album's edited version.

In March 2002, Mystikal was sued by Steve Winn, the creator of the Cajun in Your Pocket keychain toy, who claimed that "Shake Ya Ass" bore many similarities to his product.

In an interview with RapGenius, Mystikal explained that he was reluctant to release the song as a single at first, stating that he felt that it didn't adequately showcase his abilities as an artist. However, he stated that he was grateful it was released, saying that its success "proved me wrong" and that it was the "biggest song of my career".

Music video
The music video for this song shows Mystikal being invited to a party by three Black women. He later goes to the house where this party is being held. As he enters the house, he notices a group of bikini-clad women wearing masks and shaking on the dance floor. One of the women leads him upstairs, removes her mask and shows him that she was one of the three women he had met earlier. Pharrell can also be seen singing and dancing with some of the women.

Legacy
The song was listed as the 303rd best song of the 2000s by Pitchfork Media.

In popular culture
Since its release, the song has been featured in several films and other media. It has been featured in the films The Hot Chick, Zoolander, Crossroads, Down to Earth, Juwanna Mann, Scary Movie 2, Identity Thief, About A Boy, and It's a Boy Girl Thing and the HBO television series Treme, also appearing in TV series Everybody Hates Chris first-season episode 'Everybody Hates Drew'. It also appeared in the 2008 video game Grand Theft Auto IV when the player enters the Alderney strip club in the city. In 2019, the song lyrics were read by former WCW commentator Tony Schiavone on his popular podcast 'What Happened When'. This was a big success with the podcast audience and has led to Schiavone reading different rap songs every week. The song was subsequently remixed with Tony's initial version dubbed in over the music.

Track listing

A-side
"Shake Ya Ass" (LP version) – 4:20
"Shake Ya Ass" (instrumental) – 4:39

B-side
"Shake Ya Ass" (clean radio edit) – 4:17
"Shake It Fast" (cleaner radio edit) – 4:16

Charts

Weekly charts

Year-end charts

References

2000 singles
2000 songs
Dirty rap songs
Jive Records singles
Music videos directed by Director X
Mystikal songs
Song recordings produced by the Neptunes
Songs written by Pharrell Williams
Songs written by Mystikal
Songs written by Chad Hugo